The Naches Heights AVA is an American Viticultural Area contained within the Columbia Valley AVA. The AVA was recognized officially on 13 January 2012. Additionally, it is the first AVA in Washington state to be fully sustainable, with all 7 vineyards practicing in either biodynamic or LIVE (Low Input Viticulture and Enology) certification.  It is the smallest AVA in Washington with  planted.

Geography and climate
The soil is primarily volcanic loess. It is west of the city of Yakima. Grapes in this area must be irrigated.

Vineyards
The appellation's vineyards include Wilridge Vineyard, Naches Heights Vineyard, Strand Vineyard, Treveri Vineyard, Keller Vineyard, and Kalkruth Vineyard. Wilridge Vineyard is owned by Wilridge Winery of Seattle with 14 acres currently in production.  Naches Heights Vineyards was the first vineyard in this area. Wilridge Winery established the first winery and the first tasting room in the area. In 2017 Wilridge established the first distillery in the AVA.

Grape varieties grown in Naches Heights AVA
The grape varieties currently grown in this AVA include:
 Five red Bordeaux varieties; Cabernet Franc, Cabernet Sauvignon, Malbec, Merlot and Petite Verdot
 Two white Bordeaux varieties; Semillon and Sauvignon blanc
 Three Rhone varieties; Syrah, Mourvedre and Viognier
 Italian varietals; Barbera, Gewurtztraminer, Nebbiolo, Sangiovese, Sagrantino and Pinot grigio
 One of the Muscat grapes called White Muscat (also known as Muscat Canelli, Moscato, or Muscat de Petite Grains),
 Four Portuguese varieties; Souzao, Tinta Cao, Touriga Nacional, and Tinta Roriz.

References

American Viticultural Areas
Washington (state) wine
2012 establishments in Washington (state)